Shangyi County is a county in the northwest of Hebei province, China. It is under the administration of Zhangjiakou City, and borders Inner Mongolia to the north and west.

Administrative Divisions
Towns:
Nanhaoqian, Daqinggou, Badaogou, Hongtuliang, Xiaosuangou, Sangongdi

Townships:
Dayingpan Township, Dasuji Township, Shijing Township, Kangleng Township, Qijia Township, Taolizhuang Township, Jiashihe Township, Xiamajuan Township

Climate

References

External links

County-level divisions of Hebei
Zhangjiakou